Donnafugata Castle is  from Ragusa in Sicily, Italy.

Although the origins of Donnafugata Castle can be traced to the 14th-century most of its current Neo-Classical and Neo-Gothic appearance belongs to the 19th.

Toponymy

The name is possibly the result of a linguistic corruption of the Arabic toponym عين الصحة ('Ayn al-Ṣiḥḥat, i.e. Source of Health). In Sicilian it turns into Ronnafuata.

Alternatively, Donnafugata could translate from Italian as approximately "fugitive woman" or "woman who fled". Based on this interpretation, one legend claims that Queen Blanche of Navarre, widow of King Martin I of Aragon, was in hiding from Count , who wanted to marry her and assume leadership over Sicily. She hid in Donnafugata Castle until it was taken under siege by Cabrera, during which Giovanni Moncada helped her flee and hide again in the Steri Palace in Palermo.  While this story may be true, it is not whence the castle's name originates.

Another source claims that the name Donnafugata refers to Queen Maria Carolina, wife of Ferdinand IV, who was confined to a palace in Santa Margherita di Belice by Lord William Bentinck, British military governor of Sicily from 1811-1816.

References

External links
 
 Donnafugata Castle on Ragusa municipal website
 Donnafugata Castle on hermes-sicily.com

Ragusa, Sicily
Castles in Sicily